Presidential elections were held in South Korea on 3 May 1967. The result was a victory for Park Chung-hee, who won 51.4% of the vote. Voter turnout was 83.6%.

Nominations

Military 
The Democratic Republican Party National Convention was held on 2 February, and President Park Chung-hee was nominated as its presidential candidate without a vote.

Civilian 
In May 1965, the two largest opposition parties in the parliament, former president Yun Posun's Civil Rule Party (CRP) and stateswoman Park Soon-cheon's Democratic Party (DP), joined to create the People's Party (PP), forming a united opposition against President Park Chung-hee's military dictatorship.

In 1966, however, the radical wing of the People's Party, led by Yun, left the party, later forming the New Korea Party (NKP) in 1966. The NKP and nominated Yun for president for the 1967 presidential election. The remaining members of the People's Party, the moderates led by Park Sang-cheon, nominated former president of Korea University Yu Jin-oh.

Fearing that running two candidates to represent the civilian field might result in helping Park win easily, the two parties decided to join forces and created the New Democratic Party (NDP) on 7 February, agreeing to nominate Yun as its candidate.

Results

By-province

References

1967 elections in South Korea
Presidential elections in South Korea